Christmas Tree is a collection of short stories by the British writer Eleanor Smith, better known for her novels. It was released in the United States in 1935 under the alternative title of Seven Trees.

References

Bibliography
 Vinson, James. Twentieth-Century Romance and Gothic Writers. Macmillan, 1982.

1933 short story collections
Works by Lady Eleanor Smith
Victor Gollancz Ltd books